San Sai is a tambon (subdistrict) of Fang District, in Chiang Mai Province, Thailand. In 2005 it had a population of 11,583 people. The tambon contains 17 villages. The subdistrict is the home of Fangchanupathum School.

References

Tambon of Chiang Mai province
Populated places in Chiang Mai province